Kim Byung-kee (born July 10, 1961) is a South Korean member of parliament of the Minjoo Party of Korea.

References 

Living people
1961 births
Members of the National Assembly (South Korea)
Minjoo Party of Korea politicians
Kyung Hee University alumni
People from South Gyeongsang Province